Vittadinia arida  is an annual, herbaceous plant in the family Asteraceae, found in arid, rocky areas of the Australian outback. A small plant, 10 to 30 cm tall.

References

Astereae
Asterales of Australia
Flora of New South Wales
Flora of South Australia
Flora of Queensland
Flora of Western Australia
Flora of the Northern Territory
Plants described in 1982